The 14th Antisubmarine Squadron is a disbanded United States Army Air Forces unit. It was activated in 1942 as the 519th Bombardment Squadron and flew antisubmarine missions off the Atlantic coast until the Navy assumed its mission.  It then moved to Texas, where it was disbanded in November 1943 and its personnel were used as cadres for heavy bomber groups.

History
The squadron was first activated as the 519th Bombardment Squadron at Hyannis Naval Auxiliary Air Facility, Massachusetts on 18 October 1942, when the 377th Bombardment Group replaced the 59th Observation Group at Fort Dix Army Air Field and assumed its mission, personnel and equipment.  The 519th was initially equipped with the North American O-47s and Curtiss O-52 Owls of the 119th Observation Squadron, whose mission, personnel and equipment it absorbed on activation.  It began to convert to North American B-25 Mitchells later in the year and added Lockheed B-34 Venturas in 1943, phasing out the short range observation aircraft.

In October 1942, the Army Air Forces organized its antisubmarine forces into the single Army Air Forces Antisubmarine Command, which established the 25th Antisubmarine Wing the following month to control its forces operating over the Atlantic. Its bombardment group headquarters, including the 377th, were inactivated and the squadron, now designated the 14th Antisubmarine Squadron, was assigned directly to the 25th Wing. The squadron moved to Otis Field, Massachusetts in November 1942 (although it deployed to Langley Field, Virginia, from July to August 1943). In July 1943, the AAF and Navy reached an agreement to transfer the coastal antisubmarine mission to the Navy. This mission transfer also included an exchange of AAF long-range bombers equipped for antisubmarine warfare for Navy Consolidated B-24 Liberators without such equipment.

In October 1943, the squadron moved to Biggs Field, Texas, where it briefly flew Consolidated B-24 Liberator heavy bombers under Second Air Force. However its heavy bomber training ended lest than a month later, when it was disbanded its personnel formed cadres for new heavy bomber units.

Lineage
 Constituted as the 519th Bombardment Squadron (Heavy) on 13 October 1942
 Activated on 18 October 1942
 Redesignated 14th Anti-Submarine Squadron (Heavy) on 29 November 1942
 Disbanded on 4 November 1943

Assignments
 377th Bombardment Group, 18 October 1942.
 25th Antisubmarine Wing, 9 December 1942.
 Second Air Force, 7 October – 4 November 1943

Stations
 Hyannis Naval Auxiliary Air Facility, Massachusetts, 18 October 1942.
 Otis Field, Massachusetts, 6 November 1942 (deployed to Langley Field, Virginia, 19 July – 10 August 1943)
 Biggs Field, Texas, 7 October – 4 November 1943

Aircraft
 North American O-47, 1942
 Curtiss O-52 Owl, 1942
 North American B-25 Mitchell, 1942–1943
 Lockheed B-34 Ventura, 1943
 Consolidated B-24 Liberator, 1943

Campaigns

References

Notes

Bibliography

 
 
 

014
Military units and formations established in 1942
Military units and formations disestablished in 1943
1942 establishments in the United States